Robert Dewar Lindsay (October 21, 1919 – April 6, 1999) was a Canadian politician. He represented the electoral district of Hants West in the Nova Scotia House of Assembly from 1970 to 1978. He was a member of the Nova Scotia Liberal Party.

Lindsay was born in 1919 at Charlottetown, Prince Edward Island, the son of Reverend R.W. Lindsay. He attended primary schooling in Kentville, Nova Scotia, then attended the Simmons Institute of Funeral Service in Syracuse, New York. He was a funeral director and lived in Bedford, Nova Scotia. In April 1999, Lindsay died at the Queen Elizabeth II Health Sciences Centre in Halifax. He was buried at Hazelbrook, Prince Edward Island.

References

1919 births
1999 deaths
Nova Scotia Liberal Party MLAs
People from Bedford, Nova Scotia
People from Charlottetown